Murena may refer to:

Comic 
 Murena (comic book), Belgian comic book

Person 
 Carlo Murena, (1713–1764) was an Italian architect of the late-Baroque period active in Rome, Foligno, Perugia, and other towns in central Italy.

 Lucius Licinius Murena (praetor 88 BC), Roman senator
 Lucius Licinius Murena (consul), Roman senator
 Aulus Terentius Varro Murena, Roman senator
 Tony Muréna, (1917 – 1970) was an Italian-born Musette accordionist and jazz composer who lived and worked in France.

Hardware 

 Matra Murena, a mid-engined, rear wheel drive sports car that was produced from 1980 through 1983 by the French engineering group Matra

See also
 
 Muraena, a genus of eels